Amarapoondi is a village in Palani in the Dindigul district of Tamil Nadu, India.

References

Dindigul district